The Carhuaz Province is one of twenty provinces of the Ancash Region of Peru.

Geography
The Cordillera Blanca traverses the province. Waskaran, its highest elevation, lies on the border to the Yungay Province. Pallqarahu, Pukaranra, Qupa, Tuqllarahu, Wallqan and Yanarahu belong to the highest peaks of the province. Other mountains are listed below:

Political division
Carhuaz is divided into eleven districts, which are:
 Acopampa
 Amashca
 Anta
 Ataquero
 Carhuaz
 Marcará
 Pariahuanca
 San Miguel de Aco
 Shilla
 Tinco
 Yungar

Ethnic groups
The people in the province are mainly indigenous citizens of Quechua descent. Quechua is the language which the majority of the population (73.27%) learnt to speak in childhood, 26.47% of the residents started speaking using the Spanish language (2007 Peru Census).

References

External links
  Official website of the Carhuaz Province
  Official website of the San Miguel de Aco District

Provinces of the Ancash Region